Anna Case (October 29, 1887 -  January 7, 1984) was an American operatic lyric soprano. She recorded with Thomas Alva Edison, who used her voice extensively in "tone tests" of whether a live audience could tell the difference between the actual singer and a recording.  In addition to recordings for Edison Records on both phonograph cylinder and Diamond Disc, Case recorded for Victor and Columbia Records, and made sound film for Vitaphone.

She was born in Clinton, New Jersey, on October 29, 1887. and educated by vocal trainer Augusta Öhrström-Renard in New York. She made her debut in 1909 at the New Theatre in New York as the Dutch Boy in Werther, and from 1909–1916 was a member of the Metropolitan Opera Company. In first American performances, she created the roles of Sophie in Der Rosenkavalier (1913) and Feodor in Boris Godunov (1913). She sang Olympia in Tales of Hoffmann, Mimi in La Boheme, and Micaela in Carmen.

She wrote music and lyrics to several songs during the 1910s and '20s.  She made her film debut in the 1919 silent drama film The Hidden Truth, and sang one of her original songs in the 1926 Vitaphone short La Fiesta. She also appeared in documentaries about sound recording. In 1930 she recorded "Just Awearyin' for You" by Frank Lebby Stanton and Carrie Jacobs-Bond.

On July 18, 1931, she married ITT Corporation executive Clarence H. Mackay at  St. Mary's Roman Catholic Church in Roslyn, New York, and retired from the stage shortly afterwards. She began write songs more prolifically in 1936, penning over 50 in two years, and sang occasionally at social events. Her husband died in November, 1938, and Case died in New York City on January 7, 1984. Upon her death she bequeathed her 167.97-carat (33.59 g) Colombian emerald ring and Cartier necklace containing more than 2,000 diamonds, 35 emeralds and an oval cabochon-cut Columbian emerald of 167.97 carat to the Smithsonian Institution.

References

External links 

Anna Case papers, 1912-1969 Music Division, New York Public Library for the Performing Arts.
 Anna Case recordings at the Discography of American Historical Recordings.
Anna Case cylinder recordings, from the UCSB Cylinder Audio Archive at the University of California, Santa Barbara Library.

1887 births
1984 deaths
American operatic sopranos
People from Clinton, New Jersey
Burials at Green-Wood Cemetery
Singers from New Jersey
20th-century American women opera singers
American women songwriters
Songwriters from New York (state)